The System 573 is an arcade system board made by Konami based on the original PlayStation. The hardware was used primarily for Konami's Bemani series of music video game arcades, including the popular Dance Dance Revolution series introduced in 1998. The System 573 is available is configurable with various expansion IO boards to add extra input or output, such as the analog and digital I/O boards for Dance Dance Revolution and other Bemani games. Systems with these IO boards are often called System 573 Analog and System 573 Digital respectively. There is also  another variant called the System 573 Satellite Terminal which allows for up to 8 cabinets to be networked to a central one.

The name of the board is rooted in Japanese wordplay; each number in Japanese can be read with a number of different names, with Konami's name being one of many possible readings for "five-seven-three."

Technical specifications

The System 573 uses the same system design as the original Sony PlayStation but with a few upgrades. Notably the 573 uses double the work RAM and video RAM and is missing the CD controller from the PlayStation. Also added was an IDE port, RTC with battery backed SRAM, dedicated JAMMA and JVS interfaces, a security cart which could be used to easily add basic expansion I/O hardware and dual PCMCIA slots although these are only wired up as memory devices and cannot be used for I/O cards. The System 573 analog uses the analog audio output from a CD drive, whereas the System 573 digital gets audio through the IDE connector of a CD drive, thus all communications with the drive are digital in this version. 

Central processor: 33.8688 MHz MIPS R3000A RISC processor, 4KB cache.
Memory: 4MB of EDO work RAM, 2MB VRAM, 512KB sound RAM.
Storage: ATAPI CD-ROM drive, 16MB flash storage, 16MB PC-CARD flash storage.
Sound processor: PlayStation SPU, MAS 3507-D MPEG 1/2 decoder chip for decoding 573 Digital game audio.
I/O processor: Hitachi H8/3644 MCU for JVS functions.
Screen resolution: 256x224p or 640x480i.

List of System 573 games

System 573
Fighting Mania
Fisherman's Bait
Fisherman's Bait 2
Fisherman's Bait 3
Gun Mania
Hyper Bishi Bashi
Jikkyō Powerful Pro Yakyū EX
Konami 80's Arcade Gallery

Bemani System 573 Analog
Dance Dance Revolution (Dancing Stage in Europe)
Dance Dance Revolution 2ndMix and variants
Dancing Stage featuring True Kiss Destination
Dancing Stage featuring Dreams Come True
DrumMania
GuitarFreaks
GuitarFreaks 2ndMix

Bemani System 573 Digital
Dance Dance Revolution 3rdMix and variants
Dance Dance Revolution 4thMix and variants
Dance Dance Revolution 5thMix
DDRMAX Dance Dance Revolution 6thMix
DDRMAX2 Dance Dance Revolution 7thMix
Dance Dance Revolution Extreme
Dancing Stage Euromix
Dancing Stage Euromix 2
Dancing Stage featuring Dreams Come True
Dance Maniax
DrumMania 2ndMix through 10thMix
GuitarFreaks 3rdMix through 11thMix
Mambo a Go Go
Martial Beat

System 573 Satellite Terminal
Monster Gate
Monster Gate 2
Monster Gate 3

References

External links
System 16 - Bemani System 573 Analog Hardware (Konami)

Konami arcade system boards
Bemani games
MIPS architecture
PlayStation (console)